USS Fern is a name used more than once by the U.S. Navy:

 , a tugboat used during the American Civil War
 , a lighthouse tender built in 1871 that became a USN gunboat in 1890.
 USS Fern (1917), a lighthouse tender, was acquired by the Navy and placed in service on 4 September 1917. She was assigned to the 13th Naval District and patrolled Alaskan waters until her return to the Lighthouse Service under Executive Order of 1 July 1919.

United States Navy ship names